Shwan Kamal was born in the city of Sulaimaniyya in Iraqi Kurdistan in 1967. He is a Kurdish and German artist and sculptor.

Life and career 

Shwan Kamal was born in the city of Sulaimaniyya south of Kurdistan He studied art at the Institute of Fine Arts. He obtained a diploma in sculpture with honors degree and obtained a Bchelor from the Academy of Fine Arts from the University of Baghdad in 1991. studied the art of sculpture at the hands of great artists and professors such as Dara Hama Saeed, Ismail Fattah Al-Turk, Muhammad Ghani Hikmat, Saleh Qargoli and Mortada Al-Haddad After graduating from the Academy of Fine Arts in 1991, he returned to the city of Sulaymaniyah and worked as a teacher in the Fine Department of Sculpture until 1994, after the outbreak of the civil war in Kurdistan and the deterioration of the political situation he immigrated to Turkey and then to Greece and settled in Germany since 1995 and obtained German citizenship From 1995 to 2000 he worked as an artist in the foundry (Raymond Keitel) in Düsseldorf, after 2000 until 2015 he worked in the foundry (Rolf Kayser (Kunstgießer)) after a year 2015 Shawan moved to the Kingdom of Sweden, so far he lives and works in Malmö, Sweden. In 2018 he earned a Bachelor of Fine Arts, majoring in plastic arts and sculpture.

Work
After graduating from the Academy of Fine Arts, Shawan Kamal set up many artistic projects and statues in many cities in Kurdistan, Iraq and Europe.

Projects in Kurdistan and Iraq
After completing his studies of art in 1991, Shwan had a dream of having projects, artworks and memorials in Kurdistan, and he made some of these works until the outbreak of the civil war and its migration to Europe, from these works and statues:
 
 1992 Statue of the engineer (Hama Saaded) in front of the electricity department building in Sulaymaniyah.
 1992 Statue of Tawfaq Kahraba, who was killed in the bombing with chemical weapons in Halabja.
 1993 Statue of (xala Hajji) in Al-Aqari area in the city of Sulaymaniyah.
 1993 The monument of (shahidane chiman) in the Khanqa Falket in the city of Sulaymaniyah.
 1994 Statue of (Bakhtiar al-Askari) in the Iskan locality in the city of Erbil, the capital of the Kurdistan Region.
 2013 The statue of Justice (Eustasia) in front of a court building in the city of Erbil, capital of the Kurdistan Region.
 2014 The statue of the great poet Sherko Bekas in front of Sardam Building in Salem Street in Sulaymaniyah.
 2015 the memorial to the Kurdish poet Sherko Bekas on his last resting place in Azadi Park in the center of Sulaymaniyah.

Projects in Germany and Sweden

 Between 1995 and 2015 for a period of 20 years, Shwann made many statues and monuments in German cities, however he made a large number of statues for the Rolf Kayser foundry in Düsseldorf, the history of this foundry dates back to the fifties of the last century. He made statues and cast them out of metal for many of the great international artists such as (Tony Cragg, Thomas Schütte, Katrina Frege and Macdelina Abakanovich of Poland) and others. During the Second World War, most German cities were destroyed and destroyed as a result of the bombing of the Allied forces, and many historical statues had been removed from existence. In recent years, the German authorities have re-made many of these statues and monuments. Schwann recreated these statues and erected memorials in German cities.
 2002 Monument to the people's musician and singer (Gustav Adolf Uthmann) in the North Park in Wuppertal. 
 2009 Monument to Faris (Arnold Ross). in the Rathaus building of Wuppertal.
 2010 Statue (Justice) on the right side of the main gate of the Rathaus building of the city of Wuppertal.
 Statue (The Truth) on the left side of the main gate of the Wuppertal Rathaus building.
2011 statue (helping the poor). the center of the city of Wuppertal in the Church Square.
 2011 Statue (Gerechtigkeitsbrunnen. the Republic Square in the city of Wuppertal, Germany.
 2012 Statue of the world musician (Felix Mendelssohn) in front of the Opera Palace building in Düsseldorf. 
 2017 Statue (ulla jacobsson) for the Mölndal city of Göteborg.
 2019 statue (the city of Ahos in the 14th century) in the form of relief is currently in front of the museum of the city of Åhus. in the Skåna land of the Kingdom of Sweden.
 2020 Statue (drummer on elephant sculpture). in the Folks Park in Malmö, Kingdom of Sweden.
 
2022 Creation of a bronze award for photography called the Kamran Award at the request of Metography.
 2022 Creation of a bronze prize for Teater text called the Dana Rauf Award at the request of the Kepr Publishing Center.

References

External links
 Biography and Artistic Profile of Shwan Kamal in English

Living people
1967 births
People from Sulaymaniyah
Iraqi Kurdish people
Naturalized citizens of Germany
Iraqi emigrants to Germany
Iraqi emigrants to Sweden
German sculptors
Iraqi sculptors